Antennospora is a genus of fungi in the Halosphaeriaceae family. The genus contains two species.

References

External links
Antennospora at Index Fungorum

Microascales